Vukašin Mrnjavčević or Vukašin of Serbia (c. 1320 – 26 September 1371) was King of Serbia as the co-ruler of Stefan Uroš V from 1365 to 1371. He was also a nobleman. Principal domains of king Vukašin and his family were located in southern parts of medieval Serbia and northwestern parts of the modern region of Macedonia. He died in the Battle of Maritsa in 1371 with his brother, Jovan Uglješa.

In folk tradition, Vukašin is referred to as a usurper and, wrongly, the murderer of Tsar Uroš.

Background
According to 17th-century Ragusan historian Mavro Orbini, his father was a minor noble named Mrnjava from Zachlumia, whose sons Vukašin and Uglješa Mrnjavčević were born in Livno in western Bosnia. Some of Orbin's historical accounts are based on oral traditions of his time, but a 1280 Ragusan document mentions a Mrnjan as a nobleman from Trebinje, a town in Travunia in the vicinity of Zachlumia. The same Mrnjan is mentioned again in a 1289 charter as a treasurer of the Serbian queen Helen of Anjou. After Zachlumia was annexed by Bosnia in 1326, the family of Mrnjan, or Mrnjava, could have moved to Livno. Possibly the family supported Serbian Emperor Dušan's invasion of Bosnia in 1350, as did other Zachlumian nobles, and fearing punishment, emigrated to Serbia when the war was about to start. In favor of Zachumlian or Travunian origin of Vukašin also speaks the inscription on the tomb in a church in Ohrid, where certain Ostoja Rajaković of the Ugarčić  clan (died 1379) is referred to as a cousin of Vukašin's eldest son Marko. The Ugarčić clan is attested in contemporary sources as inhabiting the region of Trebinje.

After Serbia had expanded southwards into Macedonia, the local feudal lords—Greeks—were replaced with Serbs, many of whom were from Zachlumia and Travunia. In c. 1350 Emperor Dušan appointed Vukašin the župan (district governor) of Prilep in Macedonia. From then on Vukašin rapidly rose, and was one of the most dominant Serbian nobles at the time of the sudden death of Dušan in 1355. He was given the title of despot by Dušan's successor Emperor Stefan Uroš V. In 1365 he was crowned King of the Serbs and Greeks as the co-ruler of Emperor Uroš. He ruled over an area which included Prizren, Skopje and Prilep, and had good relations with his brother, Despot Jovan Uglješa who ruled an area around Ser. Later he became strong enough to disobey Uroš. By 1369, as Uroš was childless, Vukašin designated his eldest son Prince Marko as heir to the throne, with the title of "young king".

In 1370 he contributed to the monasteries of Mount Athos and prepared a war against the Ottoman Empire, which his brother supported. Vukašin was to attack Trebinje in June 1371 but it was never carried out. In September 1371, he established a coalition with his brother against the Ottomans and advanced. The Serbian army of the coalition numbering ca. 70,000 men met the Ottoman army led by beylerbey of Rumeli Lala Şâhin Paşa at Battle of Maritsa on 26 September 1371 where superior Ottoman tactics won over outnumbering coalition army. The Ottomans attacked the Serbian Army while they rested and Vukašin's forces were routed and himself killed during the battle.

Family
With his wife Jelena (Old Cyrillic: Алѣна), Vukašin had at least five children:
 Marko Mrnjavčević
 Andrijaš Mrnjavčević
 Dmitar Mrnjavčević
 Ivaniš Mrnjavčević
 Olivera Mrnjavčević
 Jelisanta
 Jelena, married to Rajko Moneta

In popular culture
Brian Aldiss - published an alternative-history fantasy story "The Day Of The Doomed King" about King Vukašin.

See also
 House of Mrnjavčević
 Serbian nobility conflict (1369)
 Serbian epic poetry

References

Sources
 
 
 
 
 
 
 
 
 
 
 

14th-century Serbian nobility
People of the Serbian Empire
Yukasin
Despots of the Serbian Empire
History of Kosovo
Medieval Macedonia
People from Livno
Characters in Serbian epic poetry
1320s births
1371 deaths
Medieval Serbian magnates
Medieval Serbian military leaders
14th-century soldiers